You Stand Watching is the second studio album from American pop music singer Ryan Cabrera, released in 2005. Two singles were released from the album, "Shine On" and "Photo".

Track listing

You Stand Watching (bonus disc in Wal-Mart Stores)"I Know What It Feels Like"
"All Night Train"
"Take It All Away" (Acoustic Version)
"Exit to Exit" (Acoustic Version)
"Shame On Me" (Acoustic Version)Japan & iTunes Bonus Track
"Sentimental"

Personnel
Musicians
 Ryan Cabrera – acoustic guitars and vocals
 Greg Suran – electric guitars
 Jamie Muhoberac – piano, organs, strings, keyboards
 Dorian Crozier – drums and loops
 Paul Bushnell – bass guitar
 Dakahashi – cello

Production
 Ryan Cabrera – producer
 Doug McKean – engineer, vocal engineer 
 Chris Lord-Alge – mixing
 Dimtar Krnjaic – mixing assistant
 Alan Yashida – mastering
 Ethan "Dam" Kaufmann – vocal engineer 
 Guy Erez – acoustic guitar engineer

Chart performance

References

2005 albums
Ryan Cabrera albums